Mesotrophe intortaria is a moth of the family Geometridae first described by Achille Guenée in 1858. It is found in the Oriental tropics of India, Sri Lanka to Borneo, Singapore, Sumatra and Sulawesi.

Host plants include Eucalyptus deglupta.

References

External links
New records of florivory on dipterocarp flowers

Moths of Asia
Moths described in 1858